Chaetopappa asteroides,  called the tiny lazy daisy, or Arkansas leastdaisy, is a North American species of plants in the family Asteraceae. It is native to the southern Great Plains of the United States (Kansas, Oklahoma, Texas, Louisiana, Missouri, Arkansas) and also to northeastern Mexico (Tamaulipas, Hidalgo).

Varieties
 Chaetopappa asteroides var. asteroides - most of species range
 Chaetopappa asteroides var. grandis Shinners - Río Grande Valley in Texas

References

External links
Missouri Plants: Chaetopappa asteroides
Image Archive of Central Texas Plants: Chaetopappa asteroides

asteroides
Flora of the Great Plains (North America)
Flora of Hidalgo (state)
Flora of Tamaulipas
Flora of the United States
Flora of the South-Central United States
Plants described in 1834
Taxa named by Augustin Pyramus de Candolle
Taxa named by Thomas Nuttall
Flora without expected TNC conservation status